Jaydee is a Dutch house music producer and DJ.

Jaydee or Jay Dee may also refer to:

People
Jaydee Bixby (born 1990), Canadian country musician
JayDee Maness (born 1945), American country musician
Jay Dee (1974–2006), alias of American record producer and rapper J Dilla
Jay Dee (comedian) (born 1979), American stand-up comedian
Jay Dee Daugherty (born 1952), American drummer and songwriter
Jay Dee Patton (1907–1975), American college football player and lieutenant colonel in the U.S. Armed Forces
Jay Dee Springbett (1975–2011), British-Australian record executive

Watercraft
Jay Dee (log canoe), a Chesapeake Bay log canoe
USS Jaydee III (SP-692), a United States Navy patrol vessel